Bunbury is a civil parish in Cheshire East, England. It contains 31 buildings that are recorded in the National Heritage List for England as designated listed buildings.  Of these, one is listed at Grade I, the highest grade, one is listed at Grade II*, the middle grade, and the others are at Grade II.  The parish contains the settlements of Bunbury, Bunbury Heath, and Lower Bunbury, with surrounding countryside.  Many of the listed buildings are houses, cottages, farmhouses and farm buildings, some dating back to the 17th century and timber-framed.  The other buildings are a church and associated structures, a public house, a former school, an active school, and a watermill.

Key

Buildings

See also

Listed buildings in Alpraham
Listed buildings in Beeston
Listed buildings in Calveley
Listed buildings in Haughton
Listed buildings in Peckforton
Listed buildings in Spurstow
Listed buildings in Tilstone Fearnall
Listed buildings in Tiverton
Listed buildings in Wardle

References
Citations

Sources

 
 

Listed buildings in the Borough of Cheshire East
Lists of listed buildings in Cheshire